USS Ouellet (FF-1077) was a  of the United States Navy. Ouellet was the first and only (as of January 2014) ship of the U.S. Navy to bear the name of Seaman David George Ouellet, a posthumous recipient of the Medal of Honor. The vessel was one of a class of frigates specifically designated to locate and destroy enemy submarines. The ship entered service in 1970 and was decommissioned in 1993. Ouellet was sold to Thailand in 1996 and renamed .

Construction and career 
Ouellet was laid down 15 January 1969 by Avondale Shipyards Inc., Westwego, Louisiana; launched 17 January 1970; sponsored by Mrs. Chester J. Ouellet; and commissioned 12 December 1970.

1970s 
Ouellet arrived at her homeport in Pearl Harbor, Hawaii on 15 April 1971, with her first deployment to the Western Pacific commencing on 27 January 1972. Ouellet twice came under hostile fire during this deployment, however no casualties were sustained.

During ceremonies re-establishing the U.S. Third Fleet on 1 February 1973, Ouellet became the first Third Fleet flagship since World War II.

Ouellet made her second deployment to the Western Pacific from May through 7 December 1973. She began her first regular overhaul on 14 September 1974, with completion on 3 June 1975. Ouellet was selected as the CINCPACFLT flagship for the U.S. Navy's 200th birthday ceremonies. Ouellet completed two more Western Pacific deployments prior to overhaul in late 1978. Regular overhaul was completed mid-1979 with three Western Pacific deployments to follow commencing September 1980, April 1982, and October 1983 respectively.

1980s 
Ouellet started the 1980s with the joint exercise RIMPAC in February 1980. In March of that year she headed east to conduct training and deployment work ups with the aircraft carrier  and Battle Group Echo. In September 1980 she deployed with Battle Group 'E' to the Indian Ocean and the Gulf of Oman for the Iranian Crisis.

Ouellet began her third major overhaul in February 1985. She received extensive upgrades to her gun mount, received CIWS, and SNAP II computers. In 1986 Ouellet was again preparing for a Western Pacific deployment. Ouellet deployed for her eighth time in April 1987. The frigate spent time in Subic Bay, Philippines before transiting the Strait of Malacca on the way to Diego Garcia, BIOT. When  got hit by an Iraqi Exocet missile in May 1987, the Constellation battle group deployed to the North Arabian Sea, while Ouellet went south to have port visits at Saint-Denis, Réunion – which was a historic visit of sorts as no American Navy ship made a port call there in over 100 years – then off to Port Victoria, Seychelles. The warship then joined the rest of the battle group in the North Arabian Sea in support of Operation Earnest Will. The frigate then detached from Cochrane and proceeded to Subic Bay, RPI where she had a 3-week stay before the battle group caught up and proceeded home with her. She returned to Pearl Harbor on 6 October 1987.

Ouellet started out 1988 with a special operation coordinated by the United States Coast Guard to capture Christina M, a cargo vessel laden with over 12 tons of marijuana. Instead of regular overhaul, Ouellet spent most of 1988 in a Ship's Restricted Availability repairing and upgrading most of her systems. Following extensive training, Ouellet made her ninth deployment in mid December 1988, where she headed to the Sea of Japan and the North Pacific Ocean. On 21 April 1989 USS Ouellet was first US Naval Vessel on scene for security and initial salvage of a Lockheed SR-71 Blackbird, AF Ser. No. 61-7974. She returned on 26 May 1989 to turn around and prepare to get underway again in September 1989 for "Pacific Exercises 89" (PAC EX 89).

In May 1989, Ouellet assisted firefighting efforts aboard  where six sailors were killed.

Upon return to Pearl Harbor in November 1989 she went into dry dock, refloating in February 1990. After extensive preparations and an exhaustive inspection cycle, Ouellet departed in August 1990 to Central America in support of law enforcement operations.

1990s 
Operations with a detachment of Coast Guard personnel to act as a legal "policing force" aboard Ouellet. This was the first time that a Coast Guard flag flew from a U.S. Navy warship in operations such as these. In search for drug smugglers, the frigate recovered close to 1 ton of pure, unprocessed cocaine, which was jettisoned from an unknown vessel trying to elude authorities. While on Law Enforcement Ops '90", Ouellet transited through the Panama Canal with follow-on ports-of-call in Panama and Curaçao, Netherlands Antilles. After returning in to Pearl Harbor in November 1990 Ouellet was awarded the "Battle E" for overall excellence and the Joint Meritorious Unit Citation.

In June 1991, Ouellet participated in three phases of shipboard training for midshipmen from the United States Naval Academy, and "Anti-Submarine Operations 91". Port calls made during this training period included visits to Vancouver, British Columbia, Canada and Kodiak Island, Alaska.

Ouellets final deployment was from 25 March to 24 July 1992. This Western Pacific Rim journey was her 10th major deployment, and took Ouellet to Australia . While en route, she participated in "Pacific ASW Exercise 92", and operated with elements of the Royal Australian Navy in celebration of the 50th anniversary of the Battle of the Coral Sea.

This was her final voyage as a United States Navy vessel, USS Ouellet was decommissioned on 6 August 1993.

HTMS Phutthaloetla Naphalai

The Royal Thai Navy purchased the ship from the US Navy after she was decommissioned on August 6, 1993. The ship subsequently underwent a US$14M refit at the Cascade General Shipyard, Portland, Oregon, and arrived in Thailand in 1998. The ship was renamed and commissioned as HTMS Phutthaloetla Naphalai with the identification number F-462.

US Navy Awards 

 Vietnam Service Medal, 15-Feb-1972 to 02-Mar-1972
 Combat Action Ribbon, 10-Apr-1972 to 11-Apr-1972
 Vietnam Service Medal, 13-Mar-1972 to 03-May-1972
 Vietnam Service Medal, 23-May-1972 to 31-May-1972
 Vietnam Service Medal, 03-Jun-1972 to 14-Jun-1972
 Vietnam Service Medal, 01-Jul-1972 to 31-Jul-1972
 Combat Action Ribbon, 24-Apr-1972
 Navy "E" Ribbon, 01-Jul-1974 to 01-Apr-1976
 Navy "E" Ribbon, 02-Apr-1976 to 30-Jun-1977
 Navy Expeditionary Medal, 30-Oct-1980 to 11-Mar-1981, Iran/Indian Ocean
 Navy "E" Ribbon, 01-Jul-1983 to 31-Dec-1984
 Navy Expeditionary Medal, 24-Jun-1987 to 23-Jul-1987, Persian Gulf
 Armed Forces Expeditionary Medal, 24-Jul-1987 to 24-Aug-1987, Persian Gulf
 Coast Guard SOS Ribbon, 11-Feb-1988 to 19-Feb-1988
 Secretary of the Navy Letter of Commendation, 01-Dec-1988 to 01-Apr-1989
 Joint Meritorious Unit Award, 15-Aug-1990 to 18-Nov-1990
 Navy "E" Ribbon, 01-Jul-1989 to 31-Dec-1990
 Navy "E" Ribbon, 01-Jan-1991 to 31-Dec-1992
 Secretary of the Navy Letter of Commendation as part of TG 75.4, 31-Mar-1992 to 17-Jul-1992

References

External links 

 USS Ouellet Association
 ussouellet.com
 USS Ouellet Crews Network
 NavSource images
 Navysite.de

 

Ships built in Bridge City, Louisiana
Knox-class frigates
1970 ships
Ships transferred from the United States Navy to the Royal Thai Navy